Two assembly elections took place in 2011:

2011 Northern Ireland Assembly election
2011 National Assembly for Wales election

See also 
List of elections in 2011